is a Japanese voice actor from Nagoya, Aichi who is affiliated with Aoni Production. He's also one of four male voice actors who won the Best New Actor Award at the 13th Seiyu Awards.

Filmography

Television animation
 Grimgar of Fantasy and Ash (2016), Moguzo
 All Out!! (2016), Takeo Atsuta
 Hugtto! PreCure, (2018), Charalit
 Gurazeni (2018), Natsunosuke Bonda
 Hinomaru Sumo (2018), Shinya Ozeki
 Beastars (2019), Sanou
 ID: Invaded (2020), Tsukimaru Nishimura
 One Piece (2021), Teach (young)
 Those Snow White Notes (2021), Ushio Arakawa
 Remake Our Life! (2021), Mikio Sugimoto
 Platinum End (2021), Mirai's Uncle
 Tribe Nine (2022), Manami Daimon
 Shine On! Bakumatsu Bad Boys! (2022), Bō
 Boruto: Naruto Next Generations (2022), Daizen Matsushige

Animated films
 Natsume's Book of Friends the Movie (2018), Habaki
 Her Blue Sky (2019), Masamichi Nakamura
 A Whisker Away (2020), Hajime
 Mobile Suit Gundam: Hathaway's Flash (2021), Raymond Cain
 Dakaichi: Spain Arc (2021), Antonio
 Teasing Master Takagi-san: The Movie (2022), Kimura

Video games
 Atelier Ryza: Ever Darkness & the Secret Hideout (2019), Lumbar Dorn
 Bravely Default 2 (2021), Helio
 Master Detective Archives: Rain Code (2023), Dominic Fulltank

Dubbing

Live-action
 The Human Centipede 3 (Final Sequence) (2015), Inmate 333
 Fantastic Beasts and Where to Find Them (2016), Sam
 Project Runway (2017), Jake
 Shazam! (2019), Burke Breyer
 Midsommar, (2020), Pelle
 The Tomorrow War, (2021), Charlie
 Clifford the Big Red Dog, (2022), Malik
 Jaws 2, (2022), Andy Nicholas
 Shazam! Fury of the Gods, (2023), Burke Breyer

Animation
 Ballerina (Mathurin)
 Luca (Ciccio)
 Maya the Bee (Crawley)
 PAW Patrol: The Movie (Butch)
 Strange World (Caspian)
 Victor and Valentino (Valentino)

References

External links
 Official profile
 

1987 births
Living people
Japanese male video game actors
Japanese male voice actors
Male voice actors from Nagoya
21st-century Japanese male actors
Aoni Production voice actors